Huang Ziqing (January 2, 1900 – July 23, 1982) was a Chinese chemist, who was a member of the Chinese Academy of Sciences.

References 

1900 births
1982 deaths
Members of the Chinese Academy of Sciences